Elizabeth Morley was an English silversmith.

Morley was married to the plateworker Thomas Morley, going into the silver business at his death. During her career she was described variously as a smallworker, cutler, toy dealer, goldsmith, and silversmith. She first registered a mark on 8 August 1794; further marks followed on 19 July 1796 and 1 October 1800. Furthermore she registered a Sun Insurance Policy on 15 April 1797, with another on 15 April 1807. Her address in London was given as 7 Westmoreland buildings, Aldersgate Street.

The Victoria and Albert Museum owns a variety of pieces by Morley, including a collection of bottle tickets of various sorts. Three pieces are in the collection of the National Museum of Women in the Arts; a George III tea caddy spoon of 1797, another of 1798, and a George III toddy ladle of 1802. Several pieces are owned by the Sterling and Francine Clark Art Institute as well.

References

Year of birth missing
Year of death missing
18th-century English women artists
19th-century English women artists
Artists from London
English silversmiths
Women silversmiths